Futurama is an American animated science fiction sitcom created by Matt Groening for the Fox Broadcasting Company. In 2008, the series was revived by Comedy Central. The series follows the adventures of the professional slacker Philip J. Fry, who is cryogenically preserved for 1000 years and revived on December 31, 2999. Fry finds work at an interplanetary delivery company, working alongside the one-eyed Leela and robot Bender. The series was envisioned by Groening in the mid-1990s while working on The Simpsons; he brought David X. Cohen aboard to develop storylines and characters to pitch the show to Fox.

Following its initial cancelation by Fox, Futurama began airing reruns on Cartoon Network's Adult Swim programming block, which lasted from 2003 to 2007. It was revived in 2007 as four direct-to-video films, the last of which was released in early 2009. Comedy Central entered into an agreement with 20th Century Fox Television to syndicate the existing episodes and air the films as 16 new, half-hour episodes, constituting a fifth season.

In June 2009, Comedy Central picked up the show for 26 new half-hour episodes, which began airing in 2010 and 2011. The show was renewed for a seventh season, with the first half airing in 2012 and the second in 2013. An audio-only episode featuring the original cast members was released in 2017 as an episode of The Nerdist Podcast. On February 9, 2022, Hulu revived the series with a 20-episode order set to premiere in 2023.

Futurama received critical acclaim throughout its run and was nominated for 17 Annie Awards, winning nine, and 12 Emmy Awards, winning six. It was nominated four times for a Writers Guild of America Award, winning for the episodes "Godfellas" and "The Prisoner of Benda". It was nominated for a Nebula Award and received Environmental Media Awards for the episodes "The Problem with Popplers" and "The Futurama Holiday Spectacular". Merchandise includes a tie-in comic book series, video games, calendars, clothes and figurines. In 2013, TV Guide ranked Futurama one of the top 60 Greatest TV Cartoons of All Time.

Premise

Characters

Futurama is essentially a workplace sitcom, the plot of which revolves around the Planet Express interplanetary delivery company and its employees, a small group that largely fails to conform to future society. Episodes usually feature the central trio of Fry, Leela, and Bender, though occasional storylines center on the other main characters.
Philip J. Fry (voiced by Billy West) – Fry is an immature, slovenly, yet good-hearted and sensitive pizza delivery boy who falls into a cryogenic pod, causing it to activate and freeze him just after midnight on January 1, 2000. He reawakens on New Year's Eve of 2999 and gets a job as a cargo delivery boy at Planet Express, a company owned by his only living relative, Professor Hubert J. Farnsworth. Fry's love for Leela is a recurring theme throughout the series.
Turanga Leela (voiced by Katey Sagal) – Leela is the competent, one-eyed captain of the Planet Express Ship. Abandoned as a baby, she grows up in the Cookieville Minimum Security Orphanarium believing herself to be an alien from another planet, but learns that she is actually a mutant from the sewers in the episode "Leela's Homeworld". Prior to becoming the ship's captain, Leela works as a career assignment officer at the cryogenics lab where she first meets Fry. She is Fry's primary love interest and eventually becomes his wife. Her name is a reference to the Turangalîla-Symphonie by Olivier Messiaen.
Bender Bending Rodriguez (voiced by John DiMaggio) – Bender is a foul-mouthed, heavy-drinking, cigar-smoking, kleptomaniacal, misanthropic, egocentric, ill-tempered robot manufactured by Mom's Friendly Robot Company. He is originally programmed to bend girders for suicide booths, and is later designated as assistant sales manager and cook, despite lacking a sense of taste. He is Fry's best friend and roommate. He must drink heavily to power his fuel cells and becomes the robot equivalent of drunk when low on alcohol.
Professor Hubert J. Farnsworth (voiced by Billy West) – Professor Farnsworth, also known simply as "the Professor", is Fry's distant nephew, and technically descendant. Farnsworth founds Planet Express Inc. to fund his work as a mad scientist. Although he is depicted as a brilliant scientist and inventor, at more than one-hundred and sixty years old he is extremely prone to age-related forgetfulness and fits of temper. In the episode "A Clone of My Own", the Professor clones himself to produce a successor, Cubert Farnsworth (voiced by Kath Soucie), whom he treats like a son.
Hermes Conrad (voiced by Phil LaMarr) – Hermes is the Jamaican accountant of Planet Express. A 36th-level bureaucrat (demoted to level 37 during the series) and proud of it, he is a stickler for regulation and enamored of the tedium of paperwork and bureaucracy. Hermes is also a former champion in Olympic Limbo, a sport derived from the popular party activity. He gave up limbo after the 2980 Olympics when a young fan, imitating him, broke his back and died. Hermes has a wife, LaBarbara, and a 12-year-old son, Dwight.
Dr. John A. Zoidberg (voiced by Billy West) – Zoidberg is a Decapodian, a lobster-like alien from the planet Decapod 10, and the neurotic staff physician of Planet Express. Although he claims to be an expert on humans, his knowledge of human anatomy and physiology is woefully inaccurate (at one point, he states that his doctorate is actually in art history). Zoidberg's expertise seems to be with extra-terrestrial creatures. Homeless and penniless, he lives in the dumpster behind Planet Express. Although Zoidberg is depicted as being Professor Farnsworth's long-time friend, he is held in contempt by everyone on the crew.
Amy Wong (voiced by Lauren Tom) – Amy is an incredibly rich, blunt, ditzy, and accident-prone yet sweet-hearted long-term intern at Planet Express. She is an astrophysics student at Mars University and heiress to the western hemisphere of Mars. In the second episode of season one, the Professor states that he likes having Amy around because she has the same bloodtype as him. Born on Mars, she is ethnically Chinese and is prone to cursing in Cantonese and using 31st-century slang. Her parents are the wealthy ranchers Leo and Inez Wong. She is promiscuous in the beginning of the series, but eventually enters a monogamous relationship with Kif Kroker. In the show's sixth season, she acquires her doctorate.
Zapp Brannigan (voiced by Billy West) – Zapp Brannigan is the incompetent, extraordinarily vain captain of the DOOP starship Nimbus. Although Leela thoroughly detests him, Brannigan—a self-deluded ladies' man—pursues her relentlessly, often at great personal risk. He was originally going to be voiced by Phil Hartman, but Hartman died before production could begin.
Kif Kroker (voiced by Maurice LaMarche) – Zapp Brannigan's 4th Lieutenant and long-suffering personal assistant, Kif is a member of the amphibious species that inhabits the planet Amphibios 9. Although extremely timid, he eventually works up the courage to date Amy. Kif is often shown sighing in disgust at the nonsensical rantings of his commanding officer.
"Mom" (voiced by Tress MacNeille) – Mom is the malevolent, foul-mouthed, cruel, and narcissistic owner of MomCorp, the thirty-first century's largest shipping and manufacturing company, with a monopoly on robots. In public, she maintains the image of a sweet, kindly old woman by speaking in stereotypically antiquated statements and wearing a mechanical fat suit. She occasionally launches insidious plans for world domination and corporate takeover. She had a romantic history with the Professor which left her bitter and resentful. She has three bumbling sons, Walt, Larry, and Igner (modeled after The Three Stooges), who do her bidding despite frequent abuse, and often infuriate her with their incompetence. In Bender's Game, it is revealed that Igner's father is Professor Farnsworth. Zoidberg in the episode "The Tip of the Zoidberg" refers to Mom as Carol, which is assumed to be her first name.
Nibbler (voiced by Frank Welker) – Nibbler is Leela's pet Nibblonian, whom she rescues from an imploding planet and adopts in the episode "Love's Labours Lost in Space". Despite his deceptively cute exterior, Nibbler is actually a highly intelligent super-being whose race is responsible for maintaining order in the universe. He is revealed in "The Why of Fry" to have been directly responsible for Fry's cryogenics freezing. While the size of an average house cat, his race is capable of devouring much larger animals. He defecates dark matter, which until Bender's Game is used as fuel for space cruisers in the series.

Setting
Futurama is set in New New York at the turn of the 31st century, in a time filled with technological wonders. The city of New New York has been built over the ruins of present-day New York City, which has become a catacomb-like space that acts as New New York's sewer, referred to as "Old New York". Various devices and architecture are similar to the Populuxe style. Global warming, inflexible bureaucracy, and substance abuse are a few of the subjects given a 31st-century exaggeration in a world where the problems have become both more extreme and more common. Just as New York has become a more extreme version of itself in the future, other Earth locations are given the same treatment; Los Angeles, for example, is depicted as a smog-filled apocalyptic wasteland.

Numerous technological advances have been made between the present day and the 31st century. The Head Museum, which keeps a collection of heads alive in jars and was invented by Ron Popeil (who has a guest cameo in "A Big Piece of Garbage"), has resulted in many historical figures and current celebrities being present, including Groening himself; this became the writers' device to feature and poke fun at contemporary celebrities in the show. Several of the preserved heads shown are those of people who were already dead well before the advent of this technology; one of the most prominent examples of this anomaly is Earth president Richard Nixon, who died in 1994 and appears in numerous episodes. The Internet, while being fully immersive and encompassing all senses—even featuring its own digital world (similar to Tron or The Matrix)—is slow and largely consists of pornography, pop-up ads, and "filthy" (or Filthy Filthy) chat rooms. Some of it is edited to include educational material ostensibly for youth. Television is still a primary form of entertainment. Self-aware robots are a common sight, and are the main cause of global warming due to the exhaust from their alcohol-powered systems. The wheel is obsolete (no one but Fry even seems to recognize the design), having been forgotten and replaced by hover cars and a network of large, clear pneumatic transportation tubes.

Environmentally, common animals still remain, alongside mutated, cross-bred (sometimes with humans) and extraterrestrial animals. Ironically, spotted owls are often shown to have replaced rats as common household pests. Although rats still exist, sometimes rats act like pigeons, though pigeons still exist, as well. Anchovies have been extinct for 800 years. Earth still suffers the effects of greenhouse gases, although in one episode Leela states that its effects have been counteracted by nuclear winter. In another episode, the effects of global warming have been somewhat mitigated by the dropping of a giant ice cube into the ocean, and later by pushing Earth farther away from the sun, which also extended the year by one week.

Religion is a prominent part of society, although the dominant religions have evolved. A merging of the major religious groups of the 20th century has resulted in the First Amalgamated Church, while Voodoo is now mainstream. New religions include Oprahism, Robotology, and the banned religion of Star Trek fandom. Religious figures include Father Changstein-El-Gamal, the Robot Devil, Reverend Lionel Preacherbot, and passing references to the Space Pope, who appears to be a large crocodile-like creature. Several major holidays have robots associated with them, including the murderous Robot Santa and Kwanzaa-bot. While very few episodes focus exclusively on religion within the Futurama universe, they do cover a wide variety of subjects including predestination, prayer, the nature of salvation, and religious conversion.

Futuramas setting is a backdrop, and the writers are not above committing continuity errors if they serve to further the gags. For example, while the pilot episode implies that the previous Planet Express crew was killed by a space wasp, the later episode "The Sting" is based on the crew having been killed by space bees instead. The "world of tomorrow" setting is used to highlight and lampoon issues of today and to parody the science fiction genre.

Production

Development
The television network Fox expressed a strong desire in the mid-1990s for Matt Groening to create a new series after the success of his previous series, The Simpsons, and began conceiving Futurama during this period. In 1996, he enlisted David X. Cohen, then a writer and producer for The Simpsons, to assist in developing the show. The two spent time researching science fiction books, television shows, and films. When they pitched the series to Fox in April 1998, Groening and Cohen had composed many characters and story lines; Groening claimed they had gone "overboard" in their discussions. Groening described trying to get the show on the air as "by far the worst experience of my grown-up life".

Fox ordered thirteen episodes. Immediately after, however, Fox feared the themes of the show were not suitable for the network and Groening and Fox executives argued over whether the network would have any creative input into the show. With The Simpsons, the network has no input. Fox was particularly disturbed by the concept of suicide booths, Doctor Zoidberg, and Bender's anti-social behavior. Groening explains, "When they tried to give me notes on Futurama, I just said: 'No, we're going to do this just the way we did Simpsons.' And they said, 'Well, we don't do business that way anymore.' And I said, 'Oh, well, that's the only way I do business.'" The episode "I, Roommate" was produced to address Fox's concerns, with the script written to their specifications. Fox strongly disliked the episode, but after negotiations, Groening received the same independence with Futurama.

The name Futurama comes from a pavilion at the 1939 New York World's Fair. Designed by Norman Bel Geddes, the Futurama pavilion depicted how he imagined the world would look in 1959. Many other titles were considered for the series, including Aloha, Mars! and Doomsville, which Groening notes were "resoundly rejected, by everyone concerned with it". It takes approximately six to nine months to produce an episode of Futurama. The long production time results in several episodes being worked on simultaneously.

Executive producers

Groening and Cohen served as executive producers and showrunners during the show's entire run, and also functioned as creative consultants. Ken Keeler became an executive producer for Season 4 and subsequent seasons.

Writing
The planning for each episode began with a table meeting of writers, who discussed the plot ideas as a group. The writers are given index cards with plot points that they are required to use as the center of activity in each episode. A single staff writer wrote an outline and then produced a script. Once the first draft of a script was finished, the writers and executive producers called in the actors for a table read. After this script reading, the writers collaborated to rewrite the script as a group before sending it to the animation team. At this point the voice recording was also started and the script was out of the writers' hands.

The writing staff held three Ph.D.s, seven master's degrees, and cumulatively had more than 50 years at Harvard University. Series writer Patric M. Verrone stated, "we were easily the most overeducated cartoon writers in history".

Voice actors

Futurama had eight main cast members. Billy West performed the voices of Philip J. Fry, Professor Farnsworth, Doctor Zoidberg, Zapp Brannigan, and many other incidental characters. West auditioned for "just about every part", landing the roles of the Professor and Doctor Zoidberg. Although West read for Fry, his friend Charlie Schlatter was initially given the role of Fry. Due to a casting change, West was called back to audition again and was given the role. West claims that the voice of Fry is deliberately modeled on his own, so as to make it difficult for another person to replicate the voice. Doctor Zoidberg's voice was based on Lou Jacobi and George Jessel. The character of Zapp Brannigan was originally created and intended to be performed by Phil Hartman. Hartman insisted on auditioning for the role, and "just nailed it" according to Groening. Due to Hartman's death, West was given the role. West states that his version of Zapp Brannigan was an imitation of Hartman and also "modeled after a couple of big dumb announcers I knew".

Katey Sagal voiced Leela, and is the only member of the main cast to voice only one character. The role of Leela was originally assigned to Nicole Sullivan. In an interview in June 2010, Sagal remarked that she did not know that another person was to originally voice Leela until many years after the show first began.

John DiMaggio performed the voice of the robot Bender Bending Rodríguez and other, more minor, characters. Bender was the most difficult character to cast, as the show's creators had not decided what a robot should sound like. DiMaggio originally auditioned for the role of Professor Farnsworth, using the voice he uses to perform Bender, and also auditioned for Bender using a different voice. DiMaggio described Bender's voice as a combination of a sloppy drunk, Slim Pickens and a character his college friend created named "Charlie the sausage-lover".

Phil LaMarr voices Hermes Conrad, his son Dwight, Ethan Bubblegum Tate, and Reverend Preacherbot. Lauren Tom voices Amy Wong, and Tress MacNeille voices Mom and various other characters. Maurice LaMarche voices Kif Kroker and several supporting characters. LaMarche won the Emmy Award for Outstanding Voice-Over Performance in 2011 for his performances as Lrrr and Orson Welles in the episode "Lrrreconcilable Ndndifferences". David Herman voiced Scruffy and various supporting characters. During seasons 1–4, LaMarche is billed as supporting cast and Tom, LaMarr and Herman billed as guest stars, despite appearing in most episodes. LaMarche was promoted to main cast and Tom, LaMarr and Herman to supporting cast in Season 5, and promoted again to main cast in Season 6.

In addition to the main cast, Frank Welker voiced Nibbler and Kath Soucie voiced Cubert and several supporting and minor characters. Like The Simpsons, many episodes of Futurama feature guest voices from a wide range of professions, including actors, entertainers, bands, musicians, and scientists. Many guest-stars voiced supporting characters, although many voiced themselves, usually as their own head preserved in a jar. Recurring guest stars included Tom Kenny, Dan Castellaneta (as the Robot Devil), Dawnn Lewis, Nicole St. John, Al Gore, Phil Hendrie, Coolio and George Takei, among others. Bumper Robinson used to be a cast member of the series (who played Hermes' son Dwight), but however left the series after season 4 which caused Phil LaMarr to take over the role afterwards. John Goodman was meant to reprise the role of Robot Santa after "Xmas Story" in future episodes but was unable to reprise the role due to scheduling problems. As a result, John DiMaggio took over that role starting with "A Tale of Two Santas". In that same episode, Dan Castellaneta was unable to reprise the Robot Devil due to his work on The Simpsons. Maurice LaMarche took over that role for that episode only as Castellaneta did reprise the role in future episodes. Following Coolio's death in 2022, David X. Cohen has revealed on TMZ that he recorded new dialogue for Kwanzaabot before his death in an upcoming episode, scheduled to be released in 2023.

Animation

Futurama is produced by The Curiosity Company and 20th Century Fox Television (which is credited as 30th Century Fox Television) with the animation being done by Rough Draft Studios. The studio would receive the completed script of an episode and create a storyboard consisting of more than 100 drawings. It would then produce a pencil-drawn animatic with 1,000 frames. Rough Draft's sister studio in South Korea would render the 30,000-frame finished episode.

In addition to traditional cartoon drawing, Rough Draft Studios often used CGI for fast or complex shots, such as the movement of spaceships, explosions, nebulae, large crowds, and snow scenes. The opening sequence was entirely rendered in CGI. The CGI was rendered at 24 frames per second (as opposed to hand-drawn often done at 12 frames per second) and the lack of artifacts made the animation appear very smooth and fluid. CGI characters looked slightly different due to spatially "cheating" hand-drawn characters by drawing slightly out of proportion or off-perspective features to emphasize traits of the face or body, improving legibility of an expression. PowerAnimator and Maya were used to draw the comic-like CGI whilst Toonz was used for digital ink and paint and compositing.

The series began high-definition production in season 6, with Bender's Big Score. The opening sequence was re-rendered and scaled to adapt to the show's transition to 16:9 widescreen format.

For the final episode of season 6, Futurama was completely reanimated in three different styles: the first segment of the episode features black-and-white Fleischer- and Walter Lantz-style animation, the second was drawn in the style of a low-resolution video game, and the final segment was in the style of Japanese anime.

Hallmarks

Opening sequence
Much like the opening sequence in The Simpsons with its chalkboard gags, Lisa’s sax solo, and couch gags, Futurama has a distinctive opening sequence featuring minor gags. As the show begins, blue lights fill the screen and the Planet Express Ship flies across the screen with the title of the show being spelled out in its wake. Underneath the title is a joke caption such as "Painstakingly drawn before a live audience" or "When you see the robot: DRINK!" After flying through downtown New New York and past various recurring characters, the Planet Express ship crashes through a large screen showing a short clip from a classic cartoon. These have included clips from Quasi at the Quackadero, Looney Tunes shorts, cartoons produced by Fleischer Studios and Famous Studios, a short of The Simpsons from a Tracey Ullman episode, the show's own opening sequence in "The Devil's Hands Are Idle Playthings" or a scene from the episode. Most episodes in Season 6 use an abridged opening sequence, omitting the brief clip of a classic cartoon. "Rebirth", "That Darn Katz!", "Benderama", "Yo Leela Leela", "Decision 3012", "Forty Percent Leadbelly", "T.: The Terrestrial", "Leela and the Genestalk", and "Stench and Stenchability" have been the only episodes since "Spanish Fry" to feature a classic cartoon clip. Several episodes begin with a cold opening before the opening sequence, although these scenes do not always correspond with the episode's plot. The opening sequence has been lampooned several times within the show, in episodes including "That's Lobstertainment!", "The Problem with Popplers", as "Future-roma" in "The Duh-Vinci Code" and as "Futurella" in "Lrrreconcilable Ndndifferences". "Decision 3012" and "The Problem with Popplers" are the only episodes that directly tie into the opening, with Bender deliberately crashing the ship after seeing an advertisement for free beer in "Decision 3012", while in "The Problem with Popplers", Leela crashes through it during an ad for Popplers, with Fry saying "That's the second billboard you've crashed through this week!". "Viva Mars Vegas" features a unique handmade variant of the opening, using cardboard, plastic, and model ships guided by strings and rods.

Series director Scott Vanzo has remarked on the difficulty of animating the sequence. It took four to five weeks to fully animate the sequence, and it consists of over 80 levels of 3D animation composited together. It takes approximately one hour to render a single frame, and each second of the sequence consists of around 30 frames.

Bender's Big Score has an extended opening sequence, introducing each of the main characters. In The Beast with a Billion Backs and Bender's Game the ship passes through the screen's glass and temporarily becomes part of the environment depicted therein—a pastiche of Disney's Steamboat Willie and Yellow Submarine respectively—before crashing through the screen glass on the way out. In Into the Wild Green Yonder, a completely different opening sequence involves a trip through a futuristic version of Las Vegas located on Mars. The theme tune is sung by Seth MacFarlane and is different from the standard theme tune. The end of the film incorporates a unique variation of the opening sequence; as the Planet Express Ship enters a wormhole, it converts into a pattern of lights similar to the lights that appear in the opening sequence.

The Futurama theme was created by Christopher Tyng. The theme is played on the tubular bells but is occasionally remixed for use in specific episodes, including a version by the Beastie Boys used for the episode "Hell Is Other Robots", in which they guest starred as their own heads for both a concert and as part of the Robot Devil's song. The theme also samples a drum break originating from "Amen, Brother" by American soul group The Winstons; however, the drum break is replaced in Season 6. A remixed rendition of the theme is used in Season 5, which features altered instruments and a lower pitch. Season 6 also uses this remix, but it has been reduced again in pitch and tempo. The theme has been noted for its similarities to Pierre Henry's 1967 Psyché Rock.

It was originally intended for the Futurama theme to be remixed in every episode. This was first trialled in the opening sequence for "Mars University", however it was realized upon broadcast that the sound did not transmit well through most television sets and the idea was subsequently abandoned. Despite this, beatbox renditions of the theme performed by Billy West and John DiMaggio are used for the episodes "Bender Should Not Be Allowed on TV" and "Spanish Fry".

Languages

There are three alternative alphabets that appear often in the background of episodes, usually in the forms of graffiti, advertisements, or warning labels. Nearly all messages using alternative scripts transliterate directly into English. The first alphabet consists of abstract characters and is referred to as Alienese, a simple substitution cipher from the Latin alphabet. The second alphabet uses a more complex modular addition code, where the "next letter is given by the summation of all previous letters plus the current letter". The codes often provide additional jokes for fans dedicated enough to decode the messages. The third language sometimes used is Hebrew. Aside from these alphabets, most of the displayed wording on the show uses the Latin alphabet.

The show predicts that several English expressions will have evolved by the year 3000. For example, in the show the word Christmas has been replaced with Xmas (pronounced "ex-mas"), and the word ask with aks (pronounced axe). According to David X. Cohen, it is a running joke that the French language is extinct in the Futurama universe (though the culture remains alive), much like Latin is in the present. In the French dubbing of the show, German is used as the extinct language instead.

30th Century Fox
At the close of each episode, the 30th Century Fox Television logo is displayed. While it is the same logo as that of 20th Century Fox, it is modified to fit the show's futuristic vibe. Syndicated episodes use the 30th Television closing logo instead of the 20th Television one. Initially, Fox did not want this logo to be used on the show, but when creator Matt Groening purchased the rights to the logo, the network had a change of heart and allowed the altered version to be aired.

Humor
Although the series uses a wide range of styles of humor, including self-deprecation, black comedy, off-color humor, slapstick, and surreal humor, its primary source of comedy is its satirical depiction of everyday life in the future and its parodical comparisons to the present. Groening notes that, from the show's conception, his goal was to make what was, on the surface, a goofy comedy that would have underlying "legitimate literary science fiction concepts". The series contrasted "low culture" and "high culture" comedy; for example, Bender's catchphrase is the insult "Bite my shiny metal ass" while his most terrifying nightmare is a vision of the number 2, a joke referring to the binary numeral system (Fry assures him, "there's no such thing as two").

The series developed a cult following partially due to the large number of in-jokes it contains, most of which are aimed at "nerds". In commentary on the DVD releases, David X. Cohen points out and sometimes explains his "nerdiest joke[s]". These included mathematical jokes such as "Loew's -plex" (aleph-null-plex) movie theater as well as various forms of science humor for example, Professor Farnsworth, at a racetrack, complains about the use of a quantum finish to decide the winner, exclaiming "No fair! You changed the outcome by measuring it", a reference to the uncertainty principle of quantum mechanics. In the season six episode "Law and Oracle", Fry and the robot peace officer URL track down a traffic violator who turns out to be Erwin Schrödinger, the 20th-century quantum physicist. On the front seat of the car is a box, and when questioned about the contents, Schrödinger replies "A cat, some poison, and a cesium atom". Fry asks if the cat is alive or dead, and Schrödinger answers "It's a superposition of both states until you open the box and collapse the wave function." When Fry opens the box, the cat jumps out and attacks him. The run is a reference to the Schrödinger's cat thought experiment of quantum mechanics. The series makes passing references to quantum chromodynamics (the appearance of Strong Force-brand glue), computer science (two separate books in a closet labeled P and NP respectively, referring to the possibility that P and NP-complete problem classes are distinct), electronics (an X-ray or more accurately, an "F-ray" of Bender's head reveals a 6502 microprocessor), and genetics (a mention of Bender's "robo- or R-NA"). The show often features subtle references to classic science fiction. These are most often to Star Trek many soundbites are used in homage but also include the reference to the origin of the word robot made in the name of the robot-dominated planet Chapek 9, and the black rectangular monolith labeled "Out of Order" in orbit around Jupiter (a reference to Arthur C. Clarke's Space Odyssey series). Bender and Fry sometimes watch a television show called The Scary Door, a humorous parody of The Twilight Zone.

Journalist/critic Frank Lovece in Newsday contrasted the humor tradition of Groening's two series, finding that 

Animation maven Jerry Beck concurred: 

In an interview with Diego Molano, creator of Victor & Valentino, in April 2019, he said that he found Futurama "incredibly influential", calling the humor smart but "not alienating". He added that it makes him "feel smart" and adding that Groening's "sense of comedic timing is masterful".

Broadcast history

Episodes

Ratings

Cancellations, syndications and revivals

Fox cancellation
Groening and Cohen wanted Futurama to be shown at 8:30 pm on Sunday, following The Simpsons. The Fox network disagreed, opting instead to show two episodes in the Sunday night lineup before moving the show to a regular time slot on Tuesday. Beginning with its second broadcast season, Futurama was again placed in the 8:30 pm Sunday spot, but by mid-season the show was moved again, this time to 7:00 pm on Sunday, its third position in less than a year. Even by the fourth season, Futurama was being aired erratically. Because the show was regularly pre-empted by sporting events, it became difficult to predict when new episodes would air. The erratic schedule resulted in Fox not airing several episodes that had been produced for seasons three and four, instead holding them for a fifth broadcast season. According to Groening, Fox executives were not supporters of the show. Although Futurama was never officially cancelled, midway through the production of the fourth season, Fox decided to stop buying episodes of Futurama, letting it go out of production before the fall 2003 lineup.

Adult Swim reruns
In 2003, Cartoon Network acquired syndication rights to Futurama and Family Guy, another animated show Fox had cancelled, for its Adult Swim block. Both shows proved to be successful immediately, leading to sister network TBS picking up the show later in 2003. The run on Adult Swim revived interest in both series, and when Family Guy found success in direct-to-DVD productions, Futuramas producers decided to try the same. In 2005, Comedy Central entered negotiations to take over the syndication rights, during which they discussed the possibility of producing new episodes. In 2006, it was announced that four straight-to-DVD films would be produced, and later split into 16 episodes comprising a fifth season of the show. Since no new Futurama projects were in production at the time of release, the final movie release Into the Wild Green Yonder was designed to stand as the Futurama series finale. However, Groening had expressed a desire to continue the franchise in some form, including a theatrical film. In an interview with CNN, Groening said that "we have a great relationship with Comedy Central and we would love to do more episodes for them, but I don't know... We're having discussions and there is some enthusiasm but I can't tell if it's just me." Futurama left Adult Swim's lineup on December 31, 2007, following a week-long marathon of the entire series. Comedy Central began airing the show the next day, with season 5 making its broadcast debut on March 23, 2008.

Comedy Central revival
In June 2009, 20th Century Fox Television announced that Comedy Central had picked up the show for 26 new half-hour episodes that began airing on June 24, 2010. The returning writing crew was smaller than the original crew. It was originally announced that main voice actors West, DiMaggio, and Sagal would return as well, but on July 17, 2009, it was announced that a casting notice was posted to replace the entire cast when 20th Century Fox Television would not meet their salary demands. The situation was later resolved, and the entire original voice-cast returned for the new episodes.

Near the end of a message from Maurice LaMarche sent to members of the "Save the Voices of Futurama" group on Facebook, LaMarche announced that the original cast would be returning for the new episodes. The Toronto Star confirmed, announcing on their website that the original cast of Futurama signed contracts with Fox to return for 26 more episodes. Similarly, an email sent to fans from Cohen and Groening reported that West, Sagal, DiMaggio, LaMarche, MacNeille, Tom, LaMarr, and Herman would all be returning for the revival.

Cohen told Newsday in August 2009 that the reported 26-episode order means "[i]t will be up to 26. I can't guarantee it will be 26. But I think there's a pretty good chance it'll be exactly 26. Fox has been a little bit cagey about it, even internally. But nobody's too concerned. We're plunging ahead". Two episodes were in the process of being voice-recorded at that time, with an additional "six scripts ... in the works, ranging in scale from 'it's a crazy idea that someone's grandmother thought of' to 'it's all on paper'.

When Futurama aired June 24, 2010, on Comedy Central, it helped the network to its highest-rated night in 2010 and its highest-rated Thursday primetime in the network's history. In March 2011, it was announced that Futurama had been renewed for a seventh season, consisting of at least 26 episodes, scheduled to air in 2012 and 2013. The first episode of season 7 premiered June 20, 2012, on Comedy Central.

In July 2011, it was reported that the show had been picked up for syndication by both local affiliates and WGN America. Broadcast of old episodes began in September 2011. On September 19, 2011, WGN America began re-running Futurama, carrying it until 2014. Futurama doubled its viewership in syndication in 2012. 

Due to the uncertain future of the series, there have been four designated series finales. "The Devil's Hands Are Idle Playthings", Into the Wild Green Yonder, "Overclockwise", and "Meanwhile" have all been written to serve as a final episode for the show.

Comedy Central cancellation
Comedy Central announced in April 2013 that they would be airing the final episode "Meanwhile" on September 4, 2013. The producers said that they are exploring options for the future of the series as "[they] have many more stories to tell", but would gauge fan reaction to the news. Groening and Cohen have previously expressed a desire to produce a theatrical film or another direct-to-video film upon conclusion of the series.

In an August 2013 interview with Milwaukee Journal Sentinel, Katey Sagal said regarding the series finale, "So I don't believe it... I just hold out hope for it because it has such a huge fan base, it's such a smart show, and why wouldn't somebody want to keep making that show; so that's my thought, I'm just in denial that it's over". Sagal also mentioned during the same interview that Groening told her at Comic-Con that "we'll find a place" and "don't worry, it's not going to end".

Simpsorama
The Simpsons episode "Simpsorama" is an official crossover with Futurama. It originally aired during the twenty-sixth season of The Simpsons on Fox on November 9, 2014, over a year after the Futurama series finale aired on Comedy Central.

Further syndication 
In October 2017, Syfy announced that they had acquired syndication rights to all 140 episodes of Futurama, adding it to its lineup on November 11, 2017, with a weekend long marathon. Futurama was Syfy's first ever American animated series (the network had an anime programming block in the past), and eventually became paired with Syfy's TZGZ block of animated original series on Saturday nights. Comedy Central continued to air the series concurrently with Syfy, usually in the mornings and early afternoon. Syfy aired episodes from the first four seasons cropped to 16:9 instead of airing them in their original 4:3 aspect ratio; Comedy Central (since 2017) and FXX would do the same.

In September 2021, FXX, which already carries The Simpsons and other 20th Television animated programming, announced that it would begin airing Futurama that November. Syfy stopped airing the show on November 10, 2021, and FXX began airing the show on November 15, 2021. Comedy Central stopped airing the show on December 23, 2021. Adult Swim then picked the show back up on December 27, 2021. Unlike FXX, Adult Swim airs the first four seasons in their original 4:3 aspect ratio, pillarboxed. However, seasons 5 through 7, which were produced in 16:9, are cropped to 4:3. Comedy Central kept the show on their website during this time, and it would return to their linear schedule on May 2, 2022.

Hulu revival
In February 2022, Hulu revived the series with a 20-episode order expected to premiere in 2023. At the time of the announcement the majority of the main voice cast was set to return, while John DiMaggio was still in negotiations. DiMaggio stated that he had not accepted the role in mid-February 2022 as he believed the entire cast of Futurama should be paid more. He stated, "Bender is part of my soul and nothing about this is meant to be disrespectful to the fans or my Futurama family. It's about self-respect. And honestly, [it's about] being tired of an industry that's become far too corporate and takes advantage of artists' time and talent... I wish I could give you every detail so you would understand, but it's not my place." In March, DiMaggio officially rejoined the series after working out a new deal, calling the prior events "Bendergate". He later revealed that he did not get a raise, "but what I did get was a lot of respect". Had he not returned, Bender would have been voiced by a different guest star each episode. In August 2022, the titles of the first 10 episodes were announced by Hulu. In February 2023, a new release date was set sometime around the 2023 summer season.

Reception, legacy, and achievements

Critical reception

The show received critical acclaim. The first season holds an 89% approval rating at review aggregator site Rotten Tomatoes, based on 18 reviews, an average rating of 8.75/10. The critical consensus reads, "Good news, everyone! Futurama is an inventive, funny, and sometimes affecting look at the world of tomorrow." Season 5 holds a rating of 100%, based on seven reviews, and an average score of 8.67/10. Season 6 has an approval rating of 100%, based on 16 reviews, and the average rating is 8.31/10. The website's critical consensus states, "Good news everyone! Futurama is as funny and endearing as ever in its sixth season." The last season received a rating of 92%, and an 8.24/10 average score based on 12 reviews.

Success
Futuramas 7:00 p.m. Sunday time slot caused the show to often be pre-empted by sports and usually have a later-than-average season premiere. It also allowed the writers and animators to get ahead of the broadcast schedule so that episodes intended for one season were not aired until the following season. By the beginning of the fourth broadcast season, all the episodes to be aired that season had already been completed and writers were working at least a year in advance.

When Futurama debuted in the Fox Sunday night lineup at 8:30 p.m. between The Simpsons and The X-Files on March 28, 1999, it managed 19 million viewers, tying for 11th overall in that week's Nielsen ratings. The following week, airing at the same time, Futurama drew 14.2 million viewers. The third episode, the first airing on Tuesday, drew 8.85 million viewers. Though its ratings were well below The Simpsons, the first season of Futurama rated higher than competing animated series: King of the Hill, Family Guy, Dilbert, South Park, and The PJs.

When Futurama was effectively canceled in 2003, it had averaged 6.4 million viewers for the first half of its fourth broadcast season.

In late 2002, Cartoon Network acquired exclusive cable syndication rights to Futurama for a reported $10 million (equivalent to $ million in ). In January 2003, the network began airing Futurama episodes as the centerpiece to the expansion of their Adult Swim cartoon block. In October 2005, Comedy Central picked up the cable syndication rights to air Futuramas 72-episode run at the start of 2008, following the expiration of Cartoon Network's contract. A Comedy Central teaser trailer announced the return of Futurama March 23, 2008, which was Bender's Big Score divided into four episodes followed by the other three movies.

On June 24, 2010, the season 6 premiere, "Rebirth", drew 2.92 million viewers in the 10:00 p.m. time slot on Comedy Central. The second episode of the sixth season, "In-A-Gadda-Da-Leela", aired at 10:30 p.m., immediately following the season premiere. "In-A-Gadda-Da-Leela" drew 2.78 million viewers. This was the series' premiere on the network, with original episodes—the fifth season had previously aired on the network, but it had originally been released in the form of the four direct-to-video films.

Accolades

Other honors
In January 2009, IGN named Futurama as the eighth best in the "Top 100 Animated TV Series".
At the 2010 San Diego Comic-Con International, Guinness World Records presented Futurama with the record for "Current Most Critically Acclaimed Animated Series".
In 2020, Rolling Stone ranked it as the thirty-ninth best science fiction television show ever.

Other media

Comic books

First started in November 2000, Futurama Comics is a comic book series published by Bongo Comics based in the Futurama universe. While originally published only in the US, a UK, German and Australian version of the series is also available. In addition, three issues were published in Norway. Other than a different running order and presentation, the stories are the same in all versions. While the comics focus on the same characters in the Futurama fictional universe, the comics may not be canonical as the events portrayed within them do not necessarily have any effect upon the continuity of the show.

Like the TV series, each comic (except US comic #20) has a caption at the top of the cover. For example: "Made In The USA! (Printed in Canada)." Some of the UK and Australian comics have different captions on the top of their comics (for example, the Australian version of #20 says "A 21st Century Comic Book" across the cover, while the US version does not have a caption on that issue). All series contain a letters page, artwork from readers, and previews of other upcoming Bongo comics.

Films

When Comedy Central began negotiating for the rights to air Futurama reruns, Fox suggested that there was a possibility of also creating new episodes. Negotiations were already underway with the possibility of creating two or three straight-to-DVD films. When Comedy Central committed to sixteen new episodes, it was decided that four films would be produced. On April 26, 2006, Groening noted in an interview that co-creator David X. Cohen and numerous writers from the original series would be returning to work on the movies. All the original voice actors participated. In February 2007, Groening explained the format of the new stories: "[The crew is] writing them as movies and then we're going to chop them up, reconfigure them, write new material and try to make them work as separate episodes."

The first film, Bender's Big Score, was written by Ken Keeler and Cohen, and includes return appearances by the Nibblonians, Seymour, Barbados Slim, Robot Santa, the "God" space entity, Al Gore, and Zapp Brannigan. It was animated in widescreen and was released on standard DVD on November 27, 2007, with a possible Blu-ray Disc release to follow. A release on HD DVD was rumored but later officially denied. Futurama: Bender's Big Score was the first DVD release for which 20th Century Fox implemented measures intended to reduce the total carbon footprint of the production, manufacturing, and distribution processes. Where it was not possible to completely eliminate carbon, output carbon offsets were used, thus making the complete process carbon neutral.

The second movie, The Beast with a Billion Backs, was released on June 24, 2008. The third movie, Bender's Game, was released on DVD and Blu-ray Disc on November 3, 2008, in the UK, November 4, 2008, in the USA, and December 10, 2008, in Australia. The fourth movie, Into the Wild Green Yonder, was released on DVD and Blu-ray Disc on February 24, 2009.

Video games

On September 15, 2000, Unique Development Studios acquired the license to develop a Futurama video game for consoles and handheld systems. Fox Interactive signed on to publish the game. Sierra Entertainment later became the game's publisher, and it was released on August 14, 2003. Versions are available for PlayStation 2 and Xbox, both of which use cel-shading technology. However, the game was subsequently canceled on the GameCube and Game Boy Advance in North America and Europe.

In 2012, an app inspired by the head in a jar gag was launched by Matt Groening.

Licensing for mobile games were done in 2016 with Futurama: Game of Drones and in 2017 with Futurama: Worlds of Tomorrow, which was released for Android and iOS in 2017.

Notes

References

External links

 
1999 American television series debuts
1990s American adult animated television series
1990s American comedy-drama television series
1990s American comic science fiction television series
1990s American satirical television series
1990s American sitcoms
1990s American workplace comedy television series
2000s American adult animated television series
2000s American comedy-drama television series
2000s American comic science fiction television series
2000s American satirical television series
2000s American sitcoms
2000s American workplace comedy television series
2010s American adult animated television series
2010s American comedy-drama television series
2010s American comic science fiction television series
2010s American satirical television series
2010s American sitcoms
2010s American workplace comedy television series
2020s American adult animated television series
2020s American comedy-drama television series
2020s American comic science fiction television series
2020s American satirical television series
2020s American sitcoms
2020s American workplace comedy television series
American animated sitcoms
American adult animated adventure television series
Animated space adventure television series
American adult animated comedy television series
American adult animated science fiction television series
American comic science fiction television series
American television series revived after cancellation
American time travel television series
Animated television series about robots
Annie Award winners
Comedy Central animated television series
Comedy Central original programming
Cultural depictions of Richard Nixon
Cryonics in fiction
English-language television shows
Fox Broadcasting Company original programming
Emmy Award-winning programs
Hulu original programming
Television shows adapted into comics
Television shows adapted into films
Television shows adapted into video games
Television series by 20th Century Fox Television
Television series by the ULULU Company
Television series by Fox Television Animation
Television series by Rough Draft Studios
Television series created by Matt Groening
Television series set in the 4th millennium
Television series set on fictional planets
Animated television series about extraterrestrial life
Television shows set in New York City
Fiction set in the 31st century
1990s American time travel television series
2000s American time travel television series
2010s American time travel television series
Self-reflexive television